James 'Jim' H Sheffield (born 1947) is a British former sports shooter.

Sports shooting career
Sheffield represented England and won a silver medal in the skeet pair with Wally Sykes, at the 1982 Commonwealth Games in Brisbane, Queensland, Australia.

References

1947 births
Living people
British male sport shooters
Shooters at the 1982 Commonwealth Games
Commonwealth Games medallists in shooting
Commonwealth Games silver medallists for England
Medallists at the 1982 Commonwealth Games